At the 2011 Pan Arab Games, the gymnastics events were held at Aspire Dome in Doha, Qatar from 10 to 14 December (Artistic) and 19–20 December (Trampoline). A total of 15 events were contested.

Medal summary

Men

Artistic

Trampoline

Women

Artistic

Trampoline

Medal table

References

External links
Artistic Gymnastics at official website
Trampoline Gymnastics at official website

2011 in gymnastics
Events at the 2011 Pan Arab Games
2011
Gymnastics competitions in Qatar